Dwars door Drenthe was an elite men's road bicycle racing event held annually in the Drenthe, Netherlands, and sanctioned by the Royal Dutch Cycling Union. It took place between 2010 and 2015.

From 2010, the men's event was UCI 1.1 rated and was part of the UCI Europe Tour. In 2011, the race was held as part of an expanded 2.1 rated Ronde van Drenthe, in which Dwars door Drenthe was held the day before the Ronde itself. The two races reverted to a stand-alone format for the 2012 edition. After the race was cancelled in 2013 due to snow, the race continued for two more years. The 2015 edition was won by Manuel Belletti; this turned out to be the final edition as the race's cancellation was announced the following September.

Winners

References

External links
  

Defunct cycling races in the Netherlands
Cycle races in the Netherlands
UCI Europe Tour races
Recurring sporting events established in 2010
2010 establishments in the Netherlands
Recurring sporting events disestablished in 2015
2015 disestablishments in the Netherlands